Poludenovka is the name of several rural localities in Russia:
Poludenovka, Moscow Oblast, a village in Tempovoye Rural Settlement of Taldomsky District of Moscow Oblast
Poludenovka, Tomsk Oblast, a village in Verkhneketsky District of Tomsk Oblast